West Portal is an unincorporated community located within Bethlehem Township, in Hunterdon County, New Jersey, United States.

The Norfolk Southern Railway's Lehigh Line (formerly the mainline of the Lehigh Valley Railroad), runs through West Portal and Lehigh Line's north entrance to the Pattenburg Tunnel (which goes underneath Musconetcong Mountain) is located in West Portal.

References

Bethlehem Township, New Jersey
Unincorporated communities in Hunterdon County, New Jersey
Unincorporated communities in New Jersey